Jitendra Verma is an Indian politician and a member of 17th Legislative Assembly, Uttar Pradesh of India. He represents the ‘Fatehabad’ constituency in Agra district of Uttar Pradesh. On January 23, 2022, he resigned from Bhartiya Janta Party and joined Samajwadi Party and was appointed distt. president of Samajwadi Party.

Political career
Jitendra Verma contested Uttar Pradesh Assembly Election as Bharatiya Janata Party candidate and defeated his close contestant Avadhesh Kumar Nishad msjhwar, Yuva Sahitykar, Rajendra Singh from Samajwadi Party with a margin of 34,364 votes.
Now he is distt. president of Samajwadi Party.

Posts held

References

Year of birth missing (living people)
Living people
Bharatiya Janata Party politicians from Uttar Pradesh
Uttar Pradesh MLAs 2017–2022